The 1996 Sioux Falls Cougars football team represented the University of Sioux Falls in the 1996 NAIA Division II football season. The team was also the South Dakota-Iowa Intercollegiate Conference champion.

Schedule

♦ denotes conference opponent.

References

Sioux Falls
Sioux Falls Cougars football seasons
NAIA Football National Champions
College football undefeated seasons
Sioux Falls Cougars football